Tikunani (or Tigunānum) was a small Hurrian city-state in Mesopotamia around the middle of the second millennium BC. The name refers to both the kingdom and its capital city. Tigunānum is the older form of the name, appearing in texts excavated from Mari around the 18th century BC. 

Tikunani is best known for a cuneiform document from the reign of Tunip-Teššup (a Hurrian-named king, contemporaneous with Hattusili I of the Hittites, around 1550 BC) containing a list of names of Habiru soldiers; see Tikunani Prism.

Cuneiform tables from Tikunani were illegally excavated in the late 1980s, possibly in the area around Diyarbakir or Bismil, but more likely from the region of the Upper Ḫabūr river. These texts are largely unpublished and in private collections; they were studied by M. Salvini and by W. G. Lambert in the late 1990s. Lambert's research was not published, however it has been dealt with in partial form via the work of A. R. George, appearing as an appendix of his 2013 Babylonian Divinatory Texts Chiefly in the Schøyen Collection.

Salvini assumes that Tikunani was a Hurrian-Akkadian state in northern Mesopotamia, which later merged into the Mittani Empire.

There is a tablet, in Akkadian, from a Hittite king named only by the title "tabarna" and written to a vassal king, Tuniya (possible the same as Tunip-Teššup), the ruler of Tikunani. In the letter the king extorts his vassal for support him in an attack against the city of Hahhu who have been dealing with the Mitanni. The tablet is thought to date to the reign of Hittite ruler Hattusili I though that is not certain.

References

Hurrian cities